V. Balakrishnan, (born 1943 as Venkataraman Balakrishnan) is an Indian theoretical physicist, who has worked in a number of fields and areas, including particle physics, many-body theory, the mechanical behavior of solids, dynamical systems, stochastic processes, and quantum dynamics.  He is an accomplished researcher who has made important contributions to the theory of anelasticity, continuous-time random walks, and recurrences in dynamical systems.

Education and career
He received his undergraduate degree from St. Stephen’s College, Delhi and PhD from Brandeis University in 1970.  After a decade at TIFR and IGCAR Kalpakkam, he joined IIT Madras as a Professor of Physics in 1980.   He was elected a Fellow of the Indian Academy of Sciences in 1985.

In addition to his research, Balakrishnan is a teacher of physics, known for his engaging teaching style.  He has taught a wide range of courses over the past 30 years from introductory physics to quantum field theory to dynamical systems.  Two of his courses (38 lectures in Classical Physics and 31 in Quantum Physics) taught at IIT Madras through National Programme on Technology Enhanced Learning are available on NPTEL's channel on YouTube, and have received more than 2.3 million views in all (as of December 2015).

 38 lectures in Classical Physics 
 31 lectures in Quantum Physics
 A third series appeared in June 2014 titled Selected Topics in Mathematical Physics.  
 Towards the end of July 2014, NPTEL released a fourth series of lectures titled Topics in Nonlinear Dynamics. 
 A fifth series entitled Basic Concepts of Elementary Physics : Mechanics, Heat, Oscillations, Waves and Thermal Physics was released in the beginning of May 2015. 
 A sixth series of lectures appeared towards the end of November 2015 titled Physical Applications of Stochastic Processes. 
 A seventh series entitled Non-equilibrium Statistical Mechanics was released in June 2016.

Publications
Balakrishnan has authored the book Mathematical Physics with Applications, Problems and Solutions (Ane Books 2017). He has also authored the book Elements of Nonequilibrium Statistical Mechanics (CRC Press 2008). A review in the journal Soft Materials explained that rather than providing comprehensive coverage of the field of nonequilibrium statistical mechanics, the book focuses on explaining the Langevin and Fokker–Planck equations. He co-authored the book Beyond the Crystalline State: An Emerging Perspective (Springer 1989).

Family
His wife, Radha Balakrishnan, is a theoretical physicist who works on nonlinear dynamics (in particular, solitons and integrable systems).  His son, Hari Balakrishnan, is currently the Fujitsu Professor of Computer Science at MIT.  His daughter, Hamsa Balakrishnan, is also on the faculty at MIT as an Professor of Aeronautics and Astronautics.

References

External links
A catalog of courses as part of the NPTEL program.
Classical Physics by Prof. V. Balakrishnan
Quantum Physics by Prof. V. Balakrishnan
Selected Topics in Mathematical Physics by Prof. V. Balakrishnan
Topics in Nonlinear Dynamics by Prof. V. Balakrishnan
Basic Concepts of Elementary Physics : Mechanics, Heat, Oscillations, Waves and Thermal Physics by Prof. V. Balakrishnan
Physical Applications of Stochastic Processes by Prof. V. Balakrishnan
Nonequilibrium Statistical Mechanics by Prof. V. Balakrishnan

20th-century Indian physicists
Fellows of the Indian Academy of Sciences
Academic staff of IIT Madras
Brandeis University alumni
Living people
1943 births
Tamil scientists
St. Stephen's College, Delhi alumni